State Peak is a remote  mountain summit located in Kings Canyon National Park, in Fresno County of northern California, United States.

History
The first ascent of the summit was likely made in 1935 by a Sierra Club party who "climbed peaks of Cirque Crest." This mountain was named by Robert B. Marshall, chief USGS geographer, and has been officially adopted by the United States Board on Geographic Names.

Climate
According to the Köppen climate classification system, State Peak is located in an alpine climate zone. Most weather fronts originate in the Pacific Ocean, and travel east toward the Sierra Nevada mountains. As fronts approach, they are forced upward by the peaks, causing them to drop their moisture in the form of rain or snowfall onto the range (orographic lift). Precipitation runoff from this mountain drains into tributaries of the South Fork Kings River.

See also

 List of mountain peaks of California

References

External links
 Weather forecast: State Peak

Mountains of Fresno County, California
Mountains of Kings Canyon National Park
North American 3000 m summits
Mountains of Northern California
Sierra Nevada (United States)